Singasandra is a suburb of Bangalore in India in the  state of Karnataka. It is on the south side of Bangalore near Electronic City. 

It is now under the Bruhat Bangalore Mahanagara Palike (Bangalore city corporation). It became a prime residential area with number of apartments. Manipal County road has many commercial buildings and supermarkets. Domino's and Star Market has started an outlet in Manipal County Road. Now commuters are using Manipal County road to reach Bannerghatta quickly. Manipal County club is located in this area. 

There is a lake named Chikka Begur Lake in this area. There are buses available every five minutes from this area to Central Bus Station and Railway Station. It is three KM away from the busy Bommanahalli Junction. It is located 5 km north of Electronic city on the Main Hosur Road on National High way number 7.

Neighbourhoods in Bangalore